Douglas Street may refer to: 

Douglas Street (Victoria, British Columbia)
Douglas Street, Hong Kong
Douglas Lane
Ak-Sar-Ben Bridge